Melinoë is a chthonic nymph or goddess invoked in one of the Orphic Hymns and represented as a bringer of nightmares and madness. The name "Melinoë" also appears on a metal tablet in association with Persephone. The hymns are of uncertain date but were probably composed in the 2nd or 3rd century AD. In the hymn, Melinoë has characteristics that seem similar to Hecate and the Erinyes, and Melinoë's name is sometimes thought to be an epithet of Hecate. The terms in which Melinoë is described are typical of moon goddesses in Greek poetry.

Name
Melinoë may derive from Greek mēlinos (μήλινος), "having the colour of quince", from mēlon (μῆλον), "tree fruit". The fruit's yellowish-green colour evoked the pallor of illness or death for the Greeks. A name derived from melas, "black", would be melan-, not mēlin-.

Hymn

Following is the translation by Apostolos Athanassakis and Benjamin M. Wolkow, of the hymn to Melinoe: 
I call upon Melinoë, saffron-cloaked nymph of the earth,whom revered Persephone bore by the mouth of the Kokytos riverupon the sacred bed of Kronian Zeus.In the guise of Plouton Zeus tricked Persephone and through wiley plots bedded her;a two-bodied specter sprang forth from Persephone's fury.This specter drives mortals to madness with her airy apparitionsas she appears in weird shapes and strange forms,now plain to the eye, now shadowy, now shining in the darkness—all this in unnerving attacks in the gloom of night.O goddess, O queen of those below, I beseech youto banish the soul's frenzy to the ends of the earth,show to the initiates a kindly and holy face.

Birth
Melinoë is the daughter of Persephone and was fathered by Zeus, whom he tricked by taking the form of Hades via "wily plots", indicating that in the hymn Persephone is already married to Hades. This is paralleled with another Orphic myth, the birth of Melinoë's brother Zagreus, who was conceived when Zeus, disguised as a serpent, deceived and mated with Persephone.

A major contributory factor surrounding Melinoë's birth is the fact that Hades and Zeus were, at times, syncretised with each other. The Orphics in particular believed that Zeus and Hades were the same deity and portrayed them as such. Zeus was portrayed as having an incarnation in the underworld identifying him as literally being Hades and leading to Zeus and Hades essentially being two representations and different facets of the same god and extended divine power. The Orphic Hymn to Melinoë also references this by mentioning that Persephone was impregnated upon the bed of Zeus Kronion in the Underworld by the River Cocytus. The hymn regarding Zeus taking on the form of Plouton before impregnating Persephone was very much related to the very nature of the way the gods were portrayed and worshiped in the Orphic Religion, as well as be the explanation for why both Hades and Zeus are considered to be the father of Melinoë; moreover it is believed that Persephone's resulting anger is derived from several things: the separation from her mother, the loss of her virginity, and the fact she had been impregnated, thus bearing children from that union.

Melinoë is born at the mouth of the Cocytus, one of the rivers of the underworld, where Hermes in his underworld aspect as psychopomp was stationed. In the Orphic tradition, the Cocytus is one of four underworld rivers.

Although some Greek myths deal with themes of incest, in Orphic genealogies lines of kinship express theological and cosmogonical concepts, not the realities of human family relations. The ancient Greek nymphē in the first line can mean "nymph", but also "bride" or "young woman". Thus Melinoë is described as such not in order to be designated as a divinity of lower status, but rather as a young woman of marriageable age; the same word is applied to Hecate and Tethys (a Titaness) in their own Orphic hymns. As an underworld "queen" (Basileia), Melinoë is at least partially syncretized with Persephone herself.

Attributes and functions
Melinoë is described in the invocation of the Orphic Hymn as κροκόπεπλος  (krokopeplos), "clad in saffron" (see peplos), an epithet in ancient Greek poetry for moon goddesses. In the hymns, only two goddesses are described as krokopeplos, Melinoë and Hecate.

Melinoë's connections to Hecate and Hermes suggest that she exercised her power in the realm of the soul's passage, and in that function may be compared to the torchbearer Eubouleos in the mysteries.

According to the hymn, she brings night terrors to mortals by manifesting in strange forms, "now plain to the eye, now shadowy, now shining in the darkness", and can drive mortals insane. The purpose of the hymn is to placate her by showing that the Orphic initiate understands and respects her nature, thereby averting the harm she has the capacity for causing.

The translation of Thomas Taylor (1887) has given rise to a conception of Melinoë as half-black, half-white, representing the duality of the heavenly Zeus and the infernal Hades. This had been the interpretation of Gottfried Hermann in his annotated text of the hymns in 1805. This duality may be implicit, like the explanation offered by Servius for why the poplar leaf has a light and dark side to represent Leuke ("White"), a nymph loved by Hades. The Orphic text poses interpretational challenges for translators in this passage.

Inscriptions 

Melinoë appears on a bronze tablet for use in the kind of private ritual usually known as "magic". The style of Greek letters on the tablet, which was discovered at Pergamon, dates it to the first half of the 3rd century AD. The use of bronze was probably intended to drive away malevolent spirits and to protect the practitioner. The construction of the tablet suggests that it was used for divination. It is triangular in shape, with a hole in the center, presumably for suspending it over a surface.

The content of the triangular tablet reiterates triplicity. It depicts three crowned goddesses, each with her head pointing at an angle and her feet pointing toward the center. The name of the goddess appears above her head: Dione (ΔΙⲰΝΗ), Phoebe (ΦΟΙΒΙΗ), and the obscure Nyche (ΝΥΧΙΗ). Amibousa, a word referring to the phases of the moon, is written under each goddess's feet. Densely inscribed spells frame each goddess: the inscriptions around Dione and Nyche are voces magicae, incantatory syllables ("magic words") that are mostly untranslatable. Melinoë appears in a triple invocation that is part of the inscription around Phoebe: O Persephone, O Melinoë, O Leucophryne. Esoteric symbols are inscribed on the edges of the triangle. Both Leucophryne and Phoebe were used as epithets of Artemis, another goddess associated with the Moon and Hecate.

In popular culture 
Melinoë will be the protagonist of the upcoming video game Hades II published by Supergiant Games.

See also
 Phobetor
 Macaria

Notes

References

External links

 Melinoë at the Theoi Project

Orphism (art)
Children of Persephone
Underworld goddesses
Magic goddesses
Greek sleep deities
Children of Zeus
Greek goddesses
Greek death goddesses
Greek underworld
Epithets of Hecate
Lunar goddesses
Chthonic beings
Shapeshifters in Greek mythology